A Hot rod is a typically American car with a large engine modified for linear speed.

Hot Rod may also refer to:

Hot Rod (video game), a 1988 arcade game by Sega
Hot Rod (1950 film), a 1950 American drama film
Hot Rod (1979 film), an American film
Hot Rod (2007 film), a film starring Andy Samberg
Hot Rod (magazine), an American car magazine
Hot Rods (oval racing), a British motorsport
Hot Rod (Transformers), several fictional robot superhero characters in the Transformers robot superhero franchise
 Bowling Green Hot Rods, the Full A team of the Tampa Bay Rays
Hot Rod Condoms, a U.S. condom brand

In music 
Hot rod music, a subgenre of surf music
"Hot Rod", a 2000 song by Peaches from The Teaches of Peaches
Hot Rod (rapper) (born 1985), American rapper and recording artist from Phoenix, Arizona

In nicknames 
Hot Rod Hundley (1934–2015), American basketball player and sportscaster
John "Hot Rod" Williams (1962–2015), American basketball player
Roddy Piper or Hot Rod (1954–2015), professional wrestler
Hot Rod Fuller, participant in the 2008 NHRA Powerade Drag Racing Series season
Rodrigo Blankenship (born 1997), American football placekicker